is a Japanese priest of Myoshin-ji branch of Rinzai School of Zen Buddhism, abbot of Shōgen-ji Temple in Shimizu-ku, Shizuoka, author and translator of books and essays on Zen that were instrumental in spreading interest in Zen literary tradition to the West in the latter half of the 20th century. Shigematsu taught English literature at Shizuoka University also visiting the United States on several occasions, most notably in 1985-6 as a Fulbright scholar. He won the Jerome J. Shestack Poetry Prize from The American Poetry Review in 1987.

Early life, education, and academic career
Shigematsu Sōiku was born in the midst of World War II in the town of Shimizu. Notably, Kijū Shigematsu was also one of the teachers of Robert Aitken Rōshi, during the latter's training at Engaku-ji monastery.

Showing great interest in English language and literature Shigematsu entered Tokyo University of Foreign Studies in 1963 (grad. 1967), subsequently conducting graduate studies at Tokyo University and Kyoto University (grad. 1971) to later take up a professorship of English Literature at Shizuoka University (1975–2001). He also lectured and did research at Shizuoka Women's University (1972–75); San Diego State University and UC Davis (1986/Fulbright scholar), and Kansai Medical University (2001-7).

Works and publications
Shigematsu's pioneering translation of the two most important Japanese collections of capping phrases or jakugo in Japanese -  Zenrin-kushū 禅林句集 (tr. as A Zen Forest, Sayings of the Masters) and Zenrin Segoshū 禅林世語集 (tr. as A Zen Harvest, Japanese Folk Zen Sayings) - is acknowledged as the magnum opus of contemporary English-speaking Zen world. In addition, he also translated poetry and sermons of Musō Soseki and Zen haiku by Natsume Sōseki.

Based on the idea of anthologizing "worldly sayings"  – insight-provoking expressions of regular people  – collected in the above-mentioned second anthology, Zenrin Segoshū, Shigematsu's current project concentrates on creation of an anthology of Zen sayings from the native English literary and other sources. Parts of it have already been published by Shizuoka University's Studies in Humanities, e.g. "Zen Sayings" from R.W. Emerson (1985), Henry D. Thoreau, Walt Whitman, Ernest Hemingway, John Steinbeck, etc.

Poetry
In addition to his Japanese - English translations of Zen poetry, Shigematsu Sōiku is a poet composing free verse in Japanese. A poem found in the recently published sixth volume of Shigematsu's poetry reads:

References

1943 births
Living people
Rinzai Buddhists
Zen Buddhist priests
Japanese Zen Buddhists